Brookfield Square is a regional shopping mall located in  Brookfield, Wisconsin, a suburb of Milwaukee. The mall is located at the intersection of Blue Mound Road and Moorland Road, near Interstate 94. It is managed by CBL & Associates Properties. The anchor stores are JCPenney, Marcus Theatres, and Barnes & Noble. There is 1 vacant anchor store that was once Boston Store.

History
Brookfield Square was built in 1967 as a three-anchor, one-story shopping mall with 60 stores and services, including the two same anchors it has today, plus a Sears, a Kohl's Food Store, a Woolworth's, T. A. Chapman's, and Walgreens. Kohl's left the mall in 1977 and its space was converted into a Houlihan's restaurant. Woolworth's and the mall's single screen cinema left the mall in 1994 and a food court was created in its place.

The mall went under a renovation in 2004, creating new outparcel stores and restaurants. The mall's interior was given a new style, and new restaurants were built on the exterior walls of the mall.

In November 2013, an expansion was proposed for nine more storefronts. Old Navy and Hallmark Cards both closed in early 2014. Also in 2014, Shoe Carnival was added in the Sears wing. The Sears anchor was closed temporarily in September 2014 because of structural concerns over its roof and closed permanently in mid-March 2018 as part of a plan to close 103 stores nationwide. Boston Store closed in August 2018, This left JCPenney as the only anchor until Fall 2019 when the former Sears space was replaced by a Movie Tavern
by Marcus and Whirlyball entertainment center.

On July 11, 2018 it was announced that Dillard's and the Streetscape Retail will be replacing the Boston Store and it was supposed to open in the Fall of 2021, but as of April 2019 it was reported Dillard's was no longer considering an expansion into the Milwaukee area.

References

CBL Properties
Shopping malls established in 1967
Buildings and structures in Milwaukee County, Wisconsin
Shopping malls in Wisconsin